71 South Wacker (previously known as the “Hyatt Center”) is an American office tower in Chicago completed in 2005. The 48-story skyscraper stands at 679 feet (207 m) on 71 South Wacker Drive. It is owned by the Irvine Company.

The 1,765,000 square foot (164,000 m2) building contains 65,000 cubic yards (50,000 m³) of concrete and 12,000 tons of structural steel. It took about 2,700 truckloads to excavate the building's foundation, and 1,300,000 man hours over nearly two years to finish. Twenty-eight high speed elevators serve the building.

The building features extensive landscape design by Chicago's Hoerr Schaudt Landscape Architects, both inside and outside, from bamboo groves, complete with fountains, lining the modern lobby to lush green grass in raised curved stone planters on the building's south side. 71 South Wacker also contains art panels by Keith Tyson and a trompe-l'œil mural by Ricci Albenda.

The anchor tenants of the building include Colliers International, Benesch Law, EVRAZ North America, Columbia Threadneedle Investments and Mayer Brown LLP. The floor 2 cafe is available to all tenants and registered guests.

The building was formerly the headquarters of the Hyatt Corporation, who relocated their headquarters to 150 North Riverside in 2017. After Hyatt relocated their headquarters, its name was removed from the building's title, and the building began using its address of 71 South Wacker as its title.

Previous concept
Originally, the Pritzker Realty Group intended for British architect Lord Norman Foster to design what was then called Pritzker Tower to house the offices of the Global Hyatt Corporation and other family holdings. However, plans for the 60-story building were scrapped due to financial considerations and the uncertainty of global events after the terrorist attacks on 9/11.

Security
Being the first high rise built in Chicago post 9/11, Kroll Security Group, the Security Consulting and Engineering division of Kroll, Inc., was hired as the security consultant for the project providing complete security systems design.

Lobby
Iconic 50-ft height atrium lobby with floor-to-ceiling glass, gently curving zen gardens and jet-mist granite walls project a bold-confidence with tranquil reflection to inspire from the outside in.

See also

Tour EDF - a similar building designed by the same firm near Paris
List of skyscrapers
List of tallest buildings in the United States
List of tallest buildings in Chicago
World's tallest structures

References

Emporis listing
Emporis listing for Pritzker Tower
Hyatt Center Website
Chicago Tribune - "Industry woes end Pritzker tower plan" by Thomas A. Corfman

Skyscraper office buildings in Chicago
Leadership in Energy and Environmental Design platinum certified buildings
Office buildings completed in 2005
2005 establishments in Illinois